Palaemon pandaliformis is a species of shrimp of the family Palaemonidae. It is found along with Palaemon northropi.

References

Palaemonidae
Crustaceans described in 1871